Rajeev Khandelwal (born 16 October 1975) is an Indian film and television actor, singer and host.

He started his career directing the television series Filmy Chakkar. His break as an actor was as the lead in the television drama, Kahiin To Hoga (2003-2005). After this he acted in many television shows which include Time Bomb 9/11 (2005), Sun Leyna (2006), Left Right Left (2007), Reporters (2015) to name a few. In 2008, he made his Bollywood debut with the film Aamir which proved to be a turning point in his career, after which he became part of many films like Shaitan (2011), Soundtrack (2011), Table No.21 (2013), Samrat & Co (2015) and others. Khandelwal made his digital debut in 2018 with Alt Balaji's Haq Se. In 2019, he appeared in another Alt Balaji web series Coldd Lassi Aur Chicken Masala opposite Divyanka Tripathi.

Apart from acting he has hosted many reality shows which are Deal Ya No Deal, Sacch Ka Saamna, Super Cars and My Endeavour. In 2015, he returned to television with Sony TV's show Reporters with Kritika Kamra. In 2018, he hosted Zee TV's talk show Juzzbaatt.

Life and family
Khandelwal belongs to Kalandri, a town situated in Sirohi district of Rajasthan. He was born on 16 October 1975 in Jaipur, Rajasthan, India in a Marwari family. He is the second son of Lt. Col. C.L. Khandelwal (retired) and Mrs Vijay Laxmi Khandelwal. His elder brother is Sanjeev Khandelwal and Rahul Khandelwal is his younger brother. He did his schooling from Kendriya Vidyalaya, Jaipur. He later earned a Bachelor's degree in Chemistry from St. Xavier's College, Ahmedabad.

In 2007, he adopted a five-year-old girl named Swati from an institute called Muskaan. Khandelwal married his longtime girlfriend Manjiri Kamtikar on 7 February 2011. He has said he is an atheist but he is not against people who follow any religion. He currently stays at Goregaon, Mumbai, India.

Career

1998–2008: Television debut and success
He started working with a Delhi based production house and also modelled for brands like LML, Green Label Whiskey, Videocon and many more. He began his television career with a negative role in the show Kya Hadsaa Kya Haqeeqat (2002). In 2002 he was offered Balaji Telefilms' Kahiin To Hoga, a romantic drama. He portrayed the character of Sujal Garewal who is 6 feet tall, dark handsome and rich, a Mills & Boonish hero and a scorned lover. For portraying Sujal Garewal, he became a recipient of many awards and accolades for Best Debut and Best Actor. In 2005, he was seen as the RAW Field Officer Varun Awasthi in Ketan Mehta's action television series, Time Bomb 9/11. In 2006, he entered C.I.D as ACP Prithviraj and also acted as Sharim in the Pakistani show, Sun Leyna. In 2006-2007 he featured in the youth based drama series, Left Right Left as Captain Rajveer Singh Shikhawat; the character was later killed off. His portrayal of this character received appreciation from audiences as well as critics.

2008–2015: Bollywood and break from television
Khandelwal made his Bollywood debut with Ronnie Screwvala's action-thriller Aamir (2008). He was cast as Dr. Aamir Ali, who returns to India from England and becomes the reluctant pawn of a terrorist group. Film critic Taran Adarsh from Bollywood Hungama reviewed "Rajeev Khandelwal is remarkable in the title role. The film would've fallen flat had it been entrusted to an inferior actor, but Rajeev lends the right shades and emerges triumphant. Watch him emote with his eyes in the latter reels mainly, and you realize that he knows the craft so well. An excellent debut!".CNN-IBN's Rajeev Masand added, "Uninhibited, spontaneous and blessed with unmistakable presence, Khandelwal holds the screen like a seasoned artist. Using his face as a canvas to display emotions, he emerges as the biggest strength of this little film." The film grossed  domestically. For his work in the film, he received the nomination of Filmfare Award for Best Male Debut. In 2011, Khandelwal had two film releases. His first appearance was in the Bejoy Nambiar's thriller film Shaitan (2012) co-starring Kalki Koechlin. He played the role of Inspector Arvind Mathur, who is assigned by the Police Commissioner to solve a case unofficially, as he is on suspension after throwing a corporator from the first floor of his own house for allegedly beating up a woman. Taran Adarsh of entertainment portal of Bollywood Hungama wrote of his performance:"Rajeev Khandelwal, playing a cop who's fighting his inner demons, nails the role, giving a tight, focused performance".

Khandelwal was next seen in Sanjiv Goenka's Soundtrack opposite Soha Ali Khan. He played the role of DJ, Raunak [Rajeev Khandelwal], who gets addicted to drugs and alcohol and loses his hearing ability. His career nosedives, but his love for music helps him resurrect himself. Subhash K. Jha of NDTV reviewed "his performance is so accomplished that he proves, not for the first time, that he's among the most engaging actors today. For the money, time and attention, he is the true rock star." Taran Adarsh added "Playing an emotionally unstable character is always taxing and an edgy journey for any actor, but Rajeev emerges triumphant with a bravura performance." The film grossed  domestically. Khandelwal next played alongside Shreyas Talpade and Mugdha Godse in the romantic comedy, Will You Marry Me? (2012). However the film did not receive very good reviews. Taran Adarsh praised Khandelwal as:"Rajeev Khandelwal handles his part with gusto." The film grossed  domestically. His next release was the psychological mystery thriller, Table No. 21 (2013) with Paresh Rawal and Tena Desae where he played the role of Vivaan Agasthi. Zee News reviewed his performance as "In this film, Rajeev has proven, yet again, the limit to which his acting skills reach, which – no doubts about that – is the sky." The film grossed  domestically.

He next featured in the romantic comedy film Ishk Actually (2013) opposite Neha Ahuja. He portrayed the character of Neil, who falls passionately for a girl named Gia. Many reviewers questioned Khandelwal about the reason for signing the film and called it "Boredom". The Times Of India cited of his performance:"Rajeev Khandelwal makes his presence felt, while the rest are mediocre. The film grossed  domestically. Khandelwal next acted in the adventure film, Peter Gaya Kaam Se alongside Lekha Washington and Prashant Narayanan. The film's release is on hold. Khandelwal plays the character of Peter Rodrigues in the film. Rajshri Productions' drama thriller Samrat & Co. opposite Madalasa Sharma was Khandelwal's next release. He played the role of Samrat Tilakdhari, a detective who is approached by a lady with a strange case. CNN-IBN criticised the film as:"Why so many good actors like Rajeev Khandelwal, Girish Karnad, Smita Jaykar and Indranil Sengupta agreed to do this film is the one mystery we were unable to solve." Faheem Ruhani of India Today reviewed:"After watching this film you miss the Rajeev Khandelwal who debuted in the brilliantly made Aamir (2008). Better to watch the more thrilling CID on TV than suffer Samrat and his company. The film grossed  domestically.

2015–present: Comeback on television and recent work
In 2015, Khandelwal appeared in the Indo-Australian film Salt Bridge where he played the role of Basant, an Indian migrant who arrives in Australia and meets an Australian woman. The film was in a competition for Oscar and has received appreciation from critics. In February 2015, Khandelwal made a comeback to television after seven years with Shrishti Arya and Goldie Behl's media drama based finite television show, Reporters opposite Kritika Kamra. He played the role of Kabir Sharma, the Editor-in-Chief of KKN with a horrid past who falls passionately for a junior reporter, Ananya Kashyap. The show received good reviews and ended on 19 October 2015. He has also worked in Rajeev Jhaveri's directorial Fever. Khandelwal will be  soon seen in Remo D'Souza's DOA Death of Amar co-starring Zarine Khan.  This was his first experience working on a public sector project. Rajeev khandelwal was the host of zee TV's Juzz baatt which aired on television in 2018 and had 26 episodes.

Other work
Khandelwal's media career started with making documentaries, writing scripts and directing those. One of his documentaries, a fictional series called Samarpan was featured on Doordarshan. Its story revolved around para military forces in India and it also won an award. Khandelwal has also hosted some reality shows. In 2006, he hosted the show Deal Ya No Deal (Indian version of Deal or No Deal) alongside Mandira Bedi. He also hosted two seasons of the reality talk show Sacch Ka Saamna in 2007 and 2008. He had also become the brand ambassador of National Geographic Channel's show Super Cars and hosted it. In 2016, Khandelwal hosted a documentary film. The Legend Of Jaggannath, which takes a behind-the-scenes look at the Indian religious festival of Rath Yatra. In 2016, he sang for the promotional version of the song "Teri Yaad" from his film Fever.

Filmography

Films

Television

Web series

Discography

Awards and nominations

See also 

 List of Indian television actors

References

External links
 
 

Living people
Marwari people
Indian male film actors
Male actors in Hindi cinema
Indian male models
Indian male television actors
Indian television presenters
Indian male voice actors
Indian atheists
Male actors from Jaipur
Indian male soap opera actors
1975 births
Kendriya Vidyalaya alumni
21st-century Indian male actors